Wildeboer is a Dutch surname. Notable people with the surname include:

Aschwin Wildeboer (born 1986), Spanish Olympic backstroke swimmer
Olaf Wildeboer (born 1983), Spanish Olympic freestyle swimmer
Tijmen Wildeboer (born 2001), Dutch footballer

Dutch-language surnames